The men's field hockey tournament at the 2020 Summer Olympics was the 24th edition of the field hockey event for men at the Summer Olympic Games. It was held from 24 July to 5 August 2021. All games were played at the Oi Hockey Stadium in Tokyo, Japan.

It was originally scheduled to be held from 25 July to 6 August 2020, but on 24 March 2020, the Olympics were postponed to 2021 due to the COVID-19 pandemic. Because of this pandemic, the games were played behind closed doors.

Argentina won the previous olympic field hockey event but were eliminated in the quarterfinals. Belgium captured their first gold medal after defeating Australia in the final after penalties. India won their first hockey medal since 1980 Summer Olympics by defeating Germany in the bronze-medal match.

The medals for the competition were presented by Baron Pierre-Oliver Bekcers-Vieujant, Belgium; IOC Member, and the medalists' bouquets were presented by Dr. Narinder Dhruv Batra, India; FIH President.

Competition schedule

Competition format
The twelve teams in the tournament were divided into two groups of six, with each team initially playing round-robin games within their group. Following the completion of the round-robin stage, the top four teams from each group advanced to the quarter-finals. The two semi-final winners met for the gold medal match, while the semi-final losers played in the bronze medal match.

Qualification

Each of the Continental Champions from five confederations received an automatic berth. Japan as the host nation qualified automatically. The other teams qualified through the 2019 Men's FIH Olympic Qualifiers.

Umpires
On 11 September 2019, 14 umpires were appointed by the FIH.

Germán Montes de Oca (ARG)
Adam Kearns (AUS)
Jakub Mejzlík (CZE)
Ben Göntgen (GER)
Martin Madden (GBR)
Raghu Prasad (IND)
Javed Shaikh (IND)
Coen van Bunge (NED)
Simon Taylor (NZL)
David Tomlinson (NZL)
Marcin Grochal (POL)
Lim Hong Zhen (SGP)
Peter Wright (RSA)
Francisco Vázquez (ESP)

Squads

Group stage
The pools were announced on 23 November 2019.

All times are local (UTC+9).

Group A

Group B

Knockout stage

Bracket

Quarter-finals

Semi-finals

Bronze medal match

Gold medal match

Final ranking

Goalscorers

References

 
Men's tournament